Victor Guzun (born April 24, 1975 in Drasliceni, Criuleni District, Moldova) is a Moldovan teacher, politician and diplomat. Currently, he is the Ambassador of the Republic of Moldova to Estonia.

Early career 
He graduated Tiraspol State University in 1996 (Geography), Free International University (Master's degree in International relations, 2002) and Estonian School of Diplomacy (2007).

Previously, Guzun held the position of Director of Foreign Relations and European Integration Department, Ministry of Transport and Road Infrastructure, Director of Centre for European Studies, lecturer of geopolitics at International Institute of Management,  deputy-director and teacher at “Gheorghe Asachi” high-school, Chisinau, Republic of Moldova.

References

External links
Personal Blog of Victor Guzun
Interviu 
Victor Guzun is the new ambassador in Estonia 
Victor Guzun - noul ambasador al RM în Estonia
Director, Foreign Relations and European Integration Department, Ministry of Transport and Road Infrastructure

1975 births
Living people
People from Criuleni District
Moldovan diplomats
Ambassadors of Moldova to Estonia
Recipients of the Order of the Cross of Terra Mariana, 1st Class